Batang is a regency on the north coast of Central Java province in Indonesia. It covers an area of 788.64 km2 and had a population of 706,764 at the 2010 Census and 801,718 at the 2020 Census. Its capital is the town of Batang, about 100 km west of the province's capital city of Semarang.

People in Batang are mostly Javanese who speak both Javanese and Indonesian.

The regency comprises both coastal and mountainous landscapes. Batang's town centre is located on the side of the north coast trans Java highway network, widely known as "the Pantura". Economic activities are concentrated along this highway and also in the vicinity of the town square known as "alun-alun". In the middle of the square, there is a huge old ficus tree which has become one of the Regency's icons.

Administrative Districts
Batang Regency comprises fifteen districts (kecamatan), tabulated below with their areas and their populations at the 2010 Census and the 2020 Census.
 The table also includes the number of administrative villages (rural desa and urban kelurahan) in each district, its post code and the location of the district headquarters.

Attractions
These include:

 Curug Genting 40m waterfall surrounded by pine forest, about 38 km southward (Blado District).
 Ujungnegoro Coast,  4 km northeastward, coast with steep edge, very rare in North  Java. Aswotomo cave and small graveyard established by the Muslim missionary Syeikh Maulana Maghribi. Canoes can be hired and there is fishing.
 Curug Gombong:  13 m waterfall that divides naturally layered stones (raj stones), situated in  Gombong village, about 6 km south of Subah District. 
 Agrotourism:  Pagilaran tea plantation in Andongsili hill and others, about 40 km to the mountain. There is a "tea walk" and tea products are on sale. Accommodation is available. 
 Batang Beach: About 3 km from town northward. Watch the sunrise and take a look at fishermen's lives.

Special events
Every "Jumat Kliwon" night (the night before a particular Friday, which coincides with the mystical fifth day of Kliwon of the Javanese calendar) people gather in the town square, creating a monthly festival with hundreds of street vendors selling goods. It occurs every 35 days.

People related to Batang
Goenawan Mohamad - democracy activist, writer and also prominent national press figure, was born in Batang.

References

External links
 Batang Regency Government - official site

» Berita Seputar Kabupaten Batang - Batang Update

Regencies of Central Java